Emmanuel "C.J." F. Davis, Jr. (born February 2, 1987) is an American football guard who is currently a Free Agent (NFL). He was signed by the Carolina Panthers as an undrafted free agent in 2009. He played college football at Pittsburgh. He is the cousin of former NFL tight end Lovett Purnell.

Professional career

Carolina Panthers
After going undrafted in the 2009 NFL Draft, Davis signed with the Carolina Panthers as an undrafted free agent on April 26, 2009. He missed the entire 2009 season due to an ankle injury.

He was released on September 12, 2011, with an injury settlement.

Denver Broncos
Davis signed with the Denver Broncos on February 15, 2012.

Seattle Seahawks
On July 24, 2014, Davis signed with the Seattle Seahawks. The Seahawks placed Davis on injured reserve on August 26, 2014.

Davis was released on May 5, 2015.

References

External links
Carolina Panthers bio
Pittsburgh Panthers bio
ESPN.com bio

1987 births
Living people
Sportspeople from Pennsylvania
Players of American football from Pennsylvania
American football offensive linemen
Pittsburgh Panthers football players
Carolina Panthers players
Denver Broncos players
Seattle Seahawks players